The Crypteia, also referred to as Krypteia or Krupteia (Greek: κρυπτεία krupteía from κρυπτός kruptós, "hidden, secret"), was an ancient Spartan state institution involving young Spartan men. It was an exclusive element of Sparta's state-sponsored child-rearing system in which participation afforded its members, known as kryptai (κρύπται, members of the Krypteia), the opportunity to test their skills further and to prove themselves worthy of the Spartan polity. As an organisation, the Crypteia's mandate and practices are still debated by historians.

Overview 
The Crypteia had young Spartan men, probably between the ages of 21 and 30, who were described as "those judged to have the most intelligence." The men were known as hêbôntes, one of the many social categories that preceded full Spartiate citizenship, and had completed their rearing at the agoge with such success that they were marked out as potential future leaders by Spartan officials. The training kryptai endured was undoubtedly harsh, but the way in which their training was conducted is debated.

According to Plato, the kryptai did not use footwear during the winter and slept without shelter. He also describes them as being unsupervised and as depending on themselves alone for survival. Plato's description might seem to imply that the kryptai were forced to be independent, but some scholars think that they may have had attendants at certain times to watch over them.

The duration of service to the Crypteia is also largely unknown, but it has been suggested that one year of service may have been all that was required of the men. Some scholars, such as Henri-Alexandre Wallon, consider the Crypteia to be a kind of secret police and state security force that was organised by the ruling class of Sparta to patrol the Laconian countryside and to terrorise the helots. Others, including Hermann Köchly and Wilhelm Wachsmuth, believe it to be a form of military training that was similar to the Athenian ephebia.

Much of the debate surrounding the Crypteia comes from the differing accounts provided by Plutarch and Plato. In Plutarch's Life of Lycurgus, he describes the brutal killing of helots on behalf of the Crypteia, but in Laws, Plato makes no mention of such killings.

History and function
According to Aristotle, the Crypteia were established by the legendary Spartan lawgiver Lycurgus. There is no known date associated with its establishment, however. Every autumn, Spartan ephors would declare war on the helot population which would allow them to kill a helot without fear of punishment. The chosen kryptai were then sent out into the countryside armed with daggers with the instructions to kill any helot they encountered travelling the roads and tending to fields they deemed too plentiful. They were specifically told to kill the strongest and to take any food they needed. The reason for adopting that practice may have been to reduce the repressed aggression of the hêbôntes. However, it is most commonly thought to have been adopted to prevent the threat of a helot rebellion and to keep their population in check. According to some sources, kryptai would stalk the helot villages and surrounding countryside, spying on the servile population. Their mission was to prevent and to suppress unrest and rebellion. Another point of contestation is the time of day at which the Crypteia operated. Plato described their movement as travelling in both day and night. On the contrary, Plutarch states that they would hide during the day and would travel by night, then aiming to kill any helots who they came across. That suggests that helots may have had to comply with curfew laws put into place by the Spartans. Troublesome helots could be summarily executed. Such brutal repression of the helots permitted the Spartan elite to successfully control the servile agrarian population and devote themselves to military practice. It may also have contributed to the Spartans' reputation for stealth since a kryptēs (κρύπτης) who got caught was punished by whipping. Aristotle's account, however, is debated even among ancient historians. Plutarch, who provides much of what is known of Aristotle's account, was not convinced that Lykourgos would have included such harsh customs within the Spartan constitution and instead thought that the Crypteia had been introduced, if at all, only after the helot revolt, brought on by an earthquake in Sparta in the mid-460s BCE. In events preceding the ten-year conflict between the Spartans and the Messenians that resulted from the helot revolt, the Spartan leadership had two thousand helots killed who had participated in the war. It is thought that the Crypteia were the primary perpetrators of the massacre or were at least somehow involved in carrying it out.

Military affiliation 
In Cleomenes, Plutarch describes the Crypteia as being a unit of the Spartan army. The Crypteia did not act in a similar fashion to hoplite soldiers, however. Hoplite soldiers were armored and acted as a part of a phalanx while members of the Crypteia acted on their own, often rested during the day, and were most likely naked and armed with only a dagger. During the Battle of Sellasia, the Spartan king Cleomenes III "called Damoteles, the commander of the Crypteia, and ordered him to observe and find out how matters stood in the rear and on the flanks of his army." Various scholars have speculated function of the Crypteia as a part of the army because Plutarch's account provides a completely different understanding of their role when compared to the accounts provided by Aristotle and Plato. Plutarch's account has led to the Cryptiea being described as a reconnaissance, special operations or even military police force. However, Jean Ducat argues that source should no longer be associated with the understanding of the Crypteia as known from Aristotle and Plato. He proposes that the understanding of the Crypteia as part of the army is just that, a separate understanding that defines the Crypteia as a corps in the Spartan army. Plutarch's account of the Crypteia describes the organisation as a military unit that has a commander, which differs from Aristotle and Plato's interpretation since the Crypteia is described as being independent and without overseers. Ducat also takes up query with the task of observation that the Crypteia are given in Plutarch's account. Again, that differs from Aristotle and Plato's interpretation in the fact that the Crypteia's mandate was not to observe or provide intelligence but to seek out purposely and kill helots. Unlike its unknown origins, the Battle of Sellasia is considered to provide a potential date for the disbandment of the Crypteia. With the Spartan revolution in jeopardy, Cleomenes III began to emancipate helots in exchange for money and then military service. With the emancipation of many helots and Spartan's subsequent defeat at Sellasia, helotage ceased to exist, and without a helot population, by mandate, the Crypteia should have ceased to exist as well. The Crypteia's disbanding after that battle, however, is only speculation.

Ritualistic activity 
The French historian Henri Jeanmaire points out that the unstructured and covert activities of the Crypteia are unlike the disciplined and well-ordered communal life of the Spartan hoplites (see Homonoia). Jeanmaire suggests that the Crypteia was a rite of passage, possibly predating the classical military organization, and may have been preserved through Sparta's legendary religious conservatism. He draws comparison with the initiation rituals of some African secret societies (wolf-men and leopard men). Members of the Crypteia may have not shared the commonality with Spartan hoplites that Jeanmaire describes during their service as apart of the institution, but they eventually returned to their communities and were integrated back into the complex Spartan social system.

Modern reception

In popular culture 
The Crypteia (as The Krypteia) are key to the indie horror film Pledge,  which brings the Greek secret society to the modern world fronting as a fraternity preying on new freshman pledges. 

The Crypteia are briefly mentioned in the comic book series Three by Kieron Gillen. They make their first appearance in issue one of Three and are depicted naked, armed with only daggers, attacking a group of unsuspecting helots as they tend to their crops. Gillien used the Crypteia to highlight the harshness of the Spartan system and describes their function  as "a rite of passage to life where all vocations are barred, bar one. Once a year, the masters declare war on the helots. If they bloody their hands, they are not polluted. So they are free to do whatever is required to keep the helots on their knees. And so they do." One of Sparta's leadings historians, Stephen Hodkinson, is noted as being the historical consultant employed by Gillen throughout the series. Hodkinson describes Gillien's depiction of the Crypteia as a "perfect amalgam" of the information available in the two source traditions; those being Plato's Laws and Plutarch's Life of Lycurgus. The reason for this, according to Hokinson, is that these two sources portray the Crypteia in different, almost contradictory, ways. Aristotle's account, which is taken from Plutarch, depicts kryptai hunting helots, while Plato's account does not mention the killing of helots and views the Crypteia as a mode of endurance training. Hodkinson claims that the differing accounts have led modern scholars to adopt a "composite" understanding of the Crypteia. 

The Krypteia are also mentioned in the book Gates of Fire. They are described as being a "secret society among the peers(full citizens)." They also are described as being assassins and being "pitiless as iron." The author also mentions that they are the youngest and the strongest of the Spartan military.

Spartan Race 
Spartan Race, the obstacle course racing series, calls their event leaders the "Krypteia".

Golden Dawn 
Maniot leaders of the far-right Greek political party, Golden Dawn, reinstituted the Crypteia as a part of their adoption of Spartan ideologies.

See also 
 Agoge
 Kóryos

References

External links
 Wallon (1850) in scanned as well as HTML version

Spartan military training
Secret police